Real Talk is the debut studio album by Christian hip hop recording artist Lecrae. There were two different versions of this album; a version released by Reach Records in 2004 and a Cross Movement Records version, released in 2005. The 2005 version of the album reached No. 29 on the Billboard Gospel Albums chart, and was on the chart for 12 weeks.

Track listing

References

Lecrae albums
Cross Movement Records albums
2004 debut albums
Reach Records albums
Albums produced by Lecrae